The 1994 AFC Youth Championship was held from 11 to 25 September 1994, in Jakarta, Indonesia. The tournament was won by for the first time by Syria in the final against Japan.

Group stage

Group A

Group B

Knockout stage

Semifinal

Third-place match

Final

Winner

 Syria and Japan qualified for 1995 FIFA World Youth Championship, as well as Qatar, which already qualified as the host.

 
1994
1994
Youth
1994 in youth association football